Yoram Hazony (born 1964) is an Israeli-American philosopher, Bible scholar, and political theorist. He is president of the Herzl Institute in Jerusalem and serves as the chairman of the Edmund Burke Foundation.

Biography
Yoram Hazony was born in Rehovot, Israel, and moved with his family to Princeton, New Jersey, US. He was raised and educated in the United States and returned to live in Israel after finishing university. Hazony received his BA from Princeton University in East Asian studies in 1986 and his PhD from Rutgers University in political philosophy in 1993. While a junior at Princeton, he founded the Princeton Tory, a magazine for moderate and conservative thought. He is the brother of David Hazony and Daniel Hazony. He married Julia Fulton, whom he met at Princeton, and she moved to Israel with him. The couple live in Jerusalem and have nine children.

Academic and journalism career
Hazony founded the Shalem Center in Jerusalem in 1994 and was president and then provost until 2012. He designed the curriculum for Shalem College, Israel's first liberal arts college, established in 2013. Hazony has served as director of the John Templeton Foundation's project in Jewish Philosophical Theology and as a member of the Israel Council for Higher Education committee examining general studies programs in Israel's universities and colleges.

He is author of a regular blog on philosophy, politics, Judaism, Israel, and higher education, called Jerusalem Letters. Hazony has published in outlets including The New York Times, Wall Street Journal, and American Affairs.

Views and opinions

Hazony is a Modern Orthodox Jew and relates his views on Open Orthodoxy in an article published in 2014. In it, he states that he fears that Open Orthodoxy is acting as an ideological echo chamber in which any unapproved views are ridiculed and quashed without debate. Hazony describes his concern that elements of Open Orthodoxy have seemingly decided to accept all conclusions of academic Bible critics as indisputable fact, without even going through the motions of investigating whether these conclusions are true.

Hazony is an outspoken Judeo-nationalist and has written that nationalism uniquely provides "the collective right of a free people to rule themselves". However, several critics of  Hazony's 2018 book, The Virtue of Nationalism, maintain it is both theoretically inconsistent or incoherent and that it bears little relation to the historical body of nationalist thought. In a review for the Tel Aviv Review of Books, Yair Wallach argues that Hazony's 2020 book, A Jewish State: Herzl and the Promise of Nationalism, is characterised by "intellectual dishonesty", in part for presenting a selective account of Theodor Herzl's understanding of Zionism and nationalism.

Bibliography
Books
 The Political Philosophy of Jeremiah: Theory, Elaboration, and Applications, (doctoral dissertation, 1993)
 The Jewish State: The Struggle for Israel's Soul (New York: Basic Books and The New Republic, 2000)
 The Philosophy of Hebrew Scripture (Cambridge: Cambridge University Press, 2012)
 God and Politics in Esther (Cambridge: Cambridge University Press, 2016)
 The Virtue of Nationalism (New York: Basic Books, 2018)
 A Jewish State: Herzl and the Promise of Nationalism [Hebrew] (Sella Meir and Tikvah Fund, 2020)
 Conservatism: A Rediscovery (Washington: Regnery, 2022)

Edited books
 David Hazony, Yoram Hazony, and Michael Oren, eds., New Essays on Zionism (Jerusalem: Shalem Press, 2006).
 Introduction to Aaron Wildavsky, Moses as Political Leader (Jerusalem: Shalem Press, 2005).
 Yoram Hazony and Dru Johnson, eds., The Question of God's Perfection (Leiden: Brill, 2018).
 Yoram Hazony, Gil Student, and Alex Sztuden, eds., The Revelation at Sinai: What Does 'Torah from Heaven' Mean? (New York: Ktav, 2021).

Translated books
 Iddo Netanyahu, Yoni's Last Battle: the Rescue at Entebbe, 1976 Yoram Hazony, trans. (Jerusalem: Gefen, 2001).

References

External links

 
 

1964 births
Living people
Princeton University alumni
Rutgers University alumni
Israeli Modern Orthodox Jews
21st-century Israeli philosophers
Political philosophers
People from Rehovot
21st-century Israeli non-fiction writers
Israeli political writers